Chayanne: Vivo is the first live album by Puerto Rican singer Chayanne.
The earliest songs from this album are from Provócame (1992).

Track listing 
Y Tú Te Vas
Yo Te Amo (Atado a Tu Amor medley)
No Te Preocupes Por Mi
Caprichosa
Tengo Miedo
Si Nos Quedara Poco Tiempo
Lola
Dejaría Todo
Un Siglo Sin Ti (Contra Vientos y Mareas medley)	
Torero
Te Echo de Menos
Provócame

DVD Version
Y Tu Te Vas
Salome/Boom Boom (Medley)
No Se Por Que
No Te Preocupe Por Mi
Caprichosa
Tengo Miedo
Si Nos Quedara Poco Tiempo
Lola
Este Ritmo Se Baila Asi/Baila Baila (Medley)
Dejaria Todo
Un Siglo Sin Ti/Contra Vientos y Mareas (Medley)
Santa Sofia
Torero
Te Echo de Menos
Provocame

De Piel A Piel 

De Piel A Piel is the fifth compilation album released after Chayanne: Vivo. It includes all the same songs from Chayanne: Vivo but not recorded live.

Track listing

 Tu Pirata Soy Yo
 Este Ritmo Se Baila Así
 Fiesta En América
 Completamente Enamorados
 Provócame
 El Centro de Mi Corazón
 Dejaría Todo
 Candela
 Yo Te Amo
 Y Tú Te Vas
 Torero
 Un Siglo Sin Ti
 Salomé
 Es Tiempo de Jugar
 Atado a Tu Amor
 Te Echo de Menos
 Si Nos Quedara Poco Tiempo
 Amor Inmortal

Music Videos
Amor Inmortal
Es Tiempo de Jugar
Yo Te Amo
Atado a Tu Amor
Un Siglo Sin Ti

Charts

Sales and certifications

References

External links
Rolling Stone Music Review
Chayanne: Vivo on Rhapsody
Chayanne: Vivo on Amazon
Official Website

Chayanne compilation albums
2008 live albums
2008 compilation albums
Live albums recorded in Buenos Aires
Chayanne live albums